Harold Cobert is a French writer. He was born in Bordeaux in 1974. He is the author of Un hiver avec Baudelaire (2009), L’Entrevue de Saint-Cloud (2010), Dieu surfe au Pays basque (2011), Au nom du père, du fils et du rock’n’roll (2013) and Lignes brisées (2015).

References

Living people
21st-century French writers
1974 births
Writers from Bordeaux
Date of birth missing (living people)